The 2005 Monaco Grand Prix Formula Three was a support race for the 2005 Monaco Grand Prix held on the Circuit de Monaco in Monte Carlo. It was the first time Formula Three cars had raced at Monaco since 1997, and remains the last to date. The race was the fourth round of 2005 Formula Three Euroseries. The first race was held on May 20, and the second race held on the May 21.

Race 1 Results

Race 2 Results

Monaco
Formula Three
Motorsport in Monaco